Trichiocercus sparshalli, the long-tailed bombyx or Sparshall's moth, is a moth of the family Notodontidae. It was first described by John Curtis in 1830 and it is found in Australia.

The wingspan is about 40 mm.

The larvae feed on Eucalyptus cinerea, Eucalyptus leucoxylon, Eucalyptus polyanthemos and Lophostemon confertus.

References

Thaumetopoeinae